In enzymology, a lignin peroxidase is an enzyme that catalyzes the chemical reaction

1,2-bis(3,4-dimethoxyphenyl)propane-1,3-diol + H2O2  3,4-dimethoxybenzaldehyde + 1-(3,4-dimethoxyphenyl)ethane-1,2-diol + H2O

Thus, the two substrates of this enzyme are 1,2-bis(3,4-dimethoxyphenyl)propane-1,3-diol and H2O2, whereas its 3 products are 3,4-dimethoxybenzaldehyde, 1-(3,4-dimethoxyphenyl)ethane-1,2-diol, and H2O.

This enzyme belongs to the family of oxidoreductases, specifically those acting on a peroxide as acceptor (peroxidases) and can be included in the broad category of ligninases. The systematic name of this enzyme class is 1,2-bis(3,4-dimethoxyphenyl)propane-1,3-diol:hydrogen-peroxide oxidoreductase. Other names in common use include diarylpropane oxygenase, ligninase I, diarylpropane peroxidase, LiP, diarylpropane:oxygen,hydrogen-peroxide oxidoreductase (C-C-bond-cleaving). It employs one cofactor, heme.

Background
Lignin is highly resistant to biodegradation and only higher fungi and some bacteria are capable of degrading the polymer via an oxidative process. This process has been studied extensively in the past twenty years, but the mechanism has not yet been fully elucidated.

Lignin is found to be degraded by enzyme lignin peroxidases produced by some fungi like Phanerochaete chrysosporium. The mechanism by which lignin peroxidase (LiP) interacts with the lignin polymer involves veratrole alcohol, which is a secondary metabolite of white rot fungi that acts as a cofactor for the enzyme.

Structural studies

References

 
 
 
 
 
 
 
 
 
 
 
 

EC 1.11.1
Heme enzymes
Enzymes of known structure